Saurita pebasa is a moth in the subfamily Arctiinae. It was described by William James Kaye in 1918. It is found in Peru.

References

Moths described in 1918
Saurita